"In My Soul/Snow Song from Mars & Roses" is the thirteenth single by Japanese recording artist Misia. It was released on December 3, 2003 as the second single from Misia's fifth studio album Mars & Roses.

Chart performance 
"In My Soul/Snow Song from Mars & Roses" debuted on the Oricon Daily Singles chart at number 8 on December 2, 2003 and climbed to number 5 two days later. The single peaked at number 7 on the Oricon Weekly Singles chart with 26,475 copies sold in its first week. It charted for nine weeks and sold a total of 48,669 copies.

Track listing

Charts, certifications and sales

Charts

Certifications and sales

Release history

References

External links 

2003 singles
Misia songs
Songs written by Misia
Songs written by Keith Crouch